Zachary Garrett Jackson (born December 25, 1994) is an American professional baseball pitcher for the Oakland Athletics of Major League Baseball (MLB). He made his MLB debut in 2022.

High school and college
Jackson attended Berryhill High School in his hometown of Tulsa, Oklahoma. In his final high school season, he was named a second-team All-American by Baseball America after pitching to a 13–1 win–loss record, 0.38 earned run average (ERA), and 147 strikeouts in 72 innings. Jackson graduated with a 4.0 grade point average, and was the valedictorian of his class.

He then attended the University of Arkansas, where he played three seasons for the Arkansas Razorbacks. In his freshman season, Jackson posted a 2.53 ERA and 42 strikeouts in 42 innings. Jackson made 27 relief appearances as a sophomore in 2015, and went 5–1 with a 2.10 ERA, 89 strikeouts, and nine saves in 60 innings pitched. His performance earned him a spot on the All-SEC First Team, as well as a position on the Collegiate National Team. In his final year with the Razorbacks, Jackson pitched as both a starter and reliever, and posted a 3–4 record with a 5.09 ERA, 66 strikeouts, and four saves.

Professional career

Toronto Blue Jays
The Toronto Blue Jays selected Jackson in the third round of the 2016 Major League Baseball draft. He signed for a $275,000 bonus and was assigned to the Rookie-level Gulf Coast League Blue Jays. After one appearance in the GCL, Jackson was promoted to the Short Season-A Vancouver Canadians of the Northwest League, where he ended the season. Jackson made 14 relief appearances in 2016, and went 1–1 with a 3.38 ERA and 23 strikeouts in 18 innings. He was assigned to the Class-A Lansing Lugnuts to begin the 2017 season, and was promoted to the Advanced-A Dunedin Blue Jays in June. Jackson finished the season with a 2–2 record, 2.47 ERA, and 68 strikeouts in 51 innings.

Oakland Athletics
On December 10, 2020, Jackson was selected by the Oakland Athletics in the minor league phase of the Rule 5 Draft. He did not play a minor league game in 2020 due to the cancellation of the minor league season caused by the COVID-19 pandemic.

On April 7, 2022, the Athletics selected Jackson's contract, adding him to their opening day roster.

References

External links

1994 births
Living people
American expatriate baseball players in Canada
Arkansas Razorbacks baseball players
Baseball players from Oklahoma
Buffalo Bisons (minor league) players
Dunedin Blue Jays players
Gulf Coast Blue Jays players
Lansing Lugnuts players
Las Vegas Aviators players
Major League Baseball pitchers
Midland RockHounds players
New Hampshire Fisher Cats players
Oakland Athletics players
Sportspeople from Tulsa, Oklahoma
Surprise Saguaros players
Vancouver Canadians players